Poliomyelitis (often simply called polio) is an acute viral infection that involves the gastrointestinal tract and occasionally the central nervous system. Poliovirus is acquired by faecal–oral or oral transmission. Prior to the introduction of a polio vaccine in 1955, infection was common, with epidemics during the summer and autumn of temperate countries. Polio eradication efforts have reduced the number of estimated polio cases worldwide by more than 99% since the mid-1980s. Most infections are asymptomatic; a small number cause a minor illness that is indistinguishable from many other viral illnesses; less than 1% result in acute flaccid paralysis. This article lists people who had the paralytic form of polio. The extent of paralysis varies from part of a limb to quadriplegia and respiratory failure. The latter was often treated with an iron lung. Around 30–40 years after contracting paralytic poliomyelitis, about 25–40% of cases lead to post-polio syndrome. Symptoms include muscle pain, further weakening of muscles and paralysis.

Surviving paralytic polio can be a life-changing experience. Individuals may be permanently physically disabled to varying degrees. Others remember the fear and isolation. Some continue to campaign for polio eradication and disability rights.

Uncontested diagnosis

This categorised alphabetical list contains people with a firm and uncontested diagnosis made while still alive.

Acting

Business

Disability rights activists

Film, television and radio

Literature

Music

Politics

Science, engineering and medicine

Sports

Visual arts

Miscellaneous

Retrospective diagnosis

The following people were not diagnosed with polio during their lifetime. A retrospective diagnosis is speculative and can never be certain.

Doubtful diagnosis
The following people may have had polio, but there is disagreement over it.

Mistakenly believed to have survived polio

The following people are often reported to have had polio, but their own statements or other evidence contradict this.

Notes

References

Poliomyelitis
Poliomyelitis